Mchenga flavimanus is a species of fish in the family Cichlidae. It is endemic to Lake Malawi.

References

flavimanus
Fish of Lake Malawi
Fish of Malawi
Fish described in 1960
Taxonomy articles created by Polbot